Mikhail Sergeyevich Kamkin (born 11 August 1985) is a former Russian professional football player.

Club career
He played in the Russian Football National League for FC Volgar-Gazprom Astrakhan in 2003.

External links
 
 

1985 births
Living people
Russian footballers
Association football midfielders
FC Volgar Astrakhan players